The 2017 Generali Open Kitzbühel was a men's tennis tournament played on outdoor clay courts. It was the 73rd edition of the Austrian Open Kitzbühel, and part of the World Tour 250 series of the 2017 ATP World Tour. It took place at the Tennis stadium Kitzbühel in Kitzbühel, Austria, from 31 July until 6 August 2017. Unseeded Philipp Kohlschreiber won the singles title.

Singles main draw entrants

Seeds

 1 Rankings are as of July 24, 2017

Other entrants
The following players received wildcards into the singles main draw:
  Tommy Haas
  Gerald Melzer 
  Sebastian Ofner

The following player received entry as a special exempt:
  Yannick Hanfmann

The following players received entry from the qualifying draw:
  Santiago Giraldo 
  Facundo Bagnis
  Maximilian Marterer 
  Miljan Zekić

The following player entered as a lucky loser:
  Thiago Monteiro

Withdrawals
Before the tournament
  Nicolás Almagro →replaced by  Carlos Berlocq
  Federico Delbonis →replaced by  Thiago Monteiro
  David Ferrer →replaced by  Mikhail Youzhny
  Denis Istomin →replaced by  Renzo Olivo
  Martin Kližan →replaced by  Dušan Lajović
  Viktor Troicki →replaced by  Andrey Kuznetsov

Doubles main draw entrants

Seeds

 Rankings are as of July 24, 2017

Other entrants
The following pairs received wildcards into the doubles main draw:
  Tommy Haas /  Sebastian Ofner 
  Gerald Melzer /  Tristan-Samuel Weissborn

Withdrawals
During the tournament
  Alessandro Giannessi

Finals

Singles

  Philipp Kohlschreiber defeated  João Sousa, 6–3, 6–4

Doubles

  Pablo Cuevas /  Guillermo Durán defeated  Hans Podlipnik-Castillo /  Andrei Vasilevski 6–4, 4–6, [12–10]

References

External links
Official website

Generali Open Kitzbuhel
Austrian Open Kitzbühel
Austrian Open